Khab-e talkh is an Iranian film directed by Mohsen Amiryoussefi in 2004. Amiryoussefi's first feature film is named the first Iranian black comedy. It took home the Caméra d'Or at that year’s Cannes as well as generous critical acclaim.

Story
The film tells the tale of Esfandiar's confrontation with the Azrael after 40 years of bathing the dead. With his life flashing before his eyes, Esfandiar is forced to reconsider his behavior towards his co-workers including: an opium addict gravedigger, a naive young man who burns clothing of the dead and a widow who washes dead women's bodies.

Critical reception
Le Monde's Jean-François Rauger wrote: Here is a strange conceptual comedy, a mixture of diverse and contradictory sensations, an experience both abstract and documentary. A surprise, an unexpected object coming from the ever exciting Iranian cinematography. Death is at the heart of Mohsen Amiryoussefi's first feature not only because the narrative lies in a cemetery, but because it is the unique preoccupation of the main character. And the film bears a special attitude towards the latter, in which reflection and laughter intersect in a cocktail eventually unprecedented. Bitter sleep is above all a farce. This is the challenge that the filmmaker has visibly explored as an explorer of what, at the heart of the least laughable reality, flits the burlesque dimension.

Awards
Khab-e talkh received notable awards from film festivals around the world.

References

External links